Impulse is a 2013 novel by Steven Gould, the third novel in the Jumper series and the fourth in the "Jumper" universe. The first two novels (Jumper and Reflex) tell a connecting story which is continued in Impulse. A sequel to Impulse, called Exo, was published on 9 September 2014.

Plot
The protagonists of the previous novels, David (Davy) Rice and his wife Millicent (Millie) Harrison-Rice, now have a teenage daughter, called "Cent" after her mother. They have relocated to a remote opulent lodge-style home in the north of Canada, bought from a billionaire who lost his wealth in the dot com crash. Here they live in isolation, hiding from the people who took her father captive and tortured him to gain control over his innate teleportation abilities, and from the government agencies who want to use them for their own ends. 

Cent decides that home schooling is stultifying and she wants a normal life with friends. When she triggers an avalanche while snowboarding without permission, she learns that she, like her parents, has the ability to jump, after she suddenly finds herself in her own bedroom. Her family relocates to a small town so that she can meet friends, but when they do, all three of them get wrapped up in a criminal conspiracy that grows larger as they investigate it. Cent learns to jump in place and add momentum/velocity as she arrives, resulting in the ability to throw herself into the air.

When Hyacinth Pope, from the group that has been trying to capture or kill David and his family, returns, she captures Cent, but Cent's innate ability to jump in place and add velocity allows her to escape.

Characters
 David Rice – Has the ability to "jump" instantaneously to any location that he can visualize accurately.
 Millie Harrison-Rice – David's wife. She shares her husband's ability and uses it to provide "instant" disaster relief and humanitarian aid around the world.
 Millicent "Cent" Rice – Named after her mother, Cent is the 16-year-old daughter of Davy and Millie. Her home schooling has more than prepared her educationally but has left her with very little experience with people her own age.
 Tara Bochinclonny – Together with Jade, Tara becomes quick friends with Cent. Tara is part Native American and comes from a broken home.
 Jade Chilton – Jade is the daughter of somewhat wealthy parents and is good friends with Tara and Cent. Together the three of them often hang out at "Java, East of Krakatoa" (the local café).
 Camelia "Caffeine" Barnett – The meanest girl in school. She is out for Cent from day one and she seems to have some secret which she is using to blackmail Tony, Grant, and Dakota.
 Tony, Grant and Dakota - Three freshmen who are constantly bullied (and sometimes assaulted) by Caffeine and her gang.
 Joe Trujeque – The captain of the snowboarding team which Cent joins.
 Brett – Brett is another member of the snowboard team and Cent's crush for much of the book. He is in a relationship with a girl named Donna.

Television adaptation

A television series adaptation, titled Impulse, was released on YouTube Premium on June 6, 2018.  However, it shares none of the characters, character names, settings, events, or themes, other than a fatherless teenage girl named Henrrietta Coles who can teleport and use telekinesis. It got canceled after its second season.

Sequel
Exo was released on 9 September 2014. It continues the story 18 months after the events of Impulse. Exo mainly follows Cent as she continues to test the limits of her abilities.

Jumping
It seems that the ability to teleport or jump can be learned. David was the first one and just did it, but Millie and Cent did it under stress after being jumped many times. In the sequels of the series the main characters discover different principles to their capabilities of jumping. In Jumper, David realizes that he is changing momentum when he jumps, both because he can jump off of a cliff and, after picking up great speed, he can jump to a perfect standstill. He also realizes that jumping is opening a hole between two places. In Reflex, he learns to jump back and forth between two places that it effectively keeps this hole open. In Impulse, Cent learns to jump and add momentum/velocity as she arrives, resulting in the ability to throw herself into the air.

References

Jumper (novel)
Novels by Steven Gould
American science fiction novels
2013 American novels
Tor Books books